Paula Newsome is an American actress. In 2021, she appeared in the crime television series CSI: Vegas, as well as the Marvel Cinematic Universe film Spider-Man: No Way Home.

Early life
Newsome grew up in Chicago and is a graduate of Morgan Park Academy. She received a bachelor's degree from Webster University’s Conservatory of Theater Arts.

Career
Newsome began having an interest in acting as a child performing in community theater, before moving to New York City. While in New York, she was cast in a number of Broadway productions. She made her big screen debut appearing in a supporting role in the 1992 comedy film Straight Talk starring Dolly Parton. She went on to guest star in a number of notable television series, include Chicago Hope, Law & Order, Ally McBeal, Dharma & Greg, NYPD Blue, ER, Heroes, and Criminal Minds.

Newsome was a regular cast member in a number of short-lived television series. First, she co-starred alongside Mark Feuerstein and Lauren Graham in the NBC sitcom Conrad Bloom (1998). In 2003, she appeared in the NBC legal drama The Lyon's Den starring Rob Lowe. From 2007 to 2008, she starred alongside Angie Harmon, Laura Harris and Aubrey Dollar in the ABC police drama Women's Murder Club playing medical examiner Claire Washburn. The following years, she returned to playing guest-starring roles, appearing on The New Adventures of Old Christine, Bones, Parenthood, FlashForward, Drop Dead Diva, Grey's Anatomy, Suits, Castle, and most notably How to Get Away with Murder opposite Viola Davis, for which she received positive reviews. She also had recurring roles on City of Angels, NCIS, and Suburgatory. In 2018 she appeared as Detective Moss in the first season of HBO's Barry. In 2019, Newsome appeared in 7 episodes of Chicago Med as Caroline Charles, ex-wife of Dr. Daniel Charles, Chief of Psychiatry, and mother of Robin Charles. She also played Jackie Vance in the popular tv series NCIS from 2009-2013

In film, Newsome has appeared in Guess Who (2005), Little Miss Sunshine (2006), Reign Over Me (2007), Things We Lost in the Fire (2007), Thinspiration (2014), Black or White (2014) and Spider-Man: No Way Home (2021).

Filmography

Film

Television

References

External links
 

20th-century American actresses
21st-century American actresses
African-American actresses
American film actresses
American stage actresses
American television actresses
Living people
Place of birth missing (living people)
Year of birth missing (living people)
Actresses from Chicago
Webster University alumni
20th-century African-American women
20th-century African-American people
21st-century African-American women
21st-century African-American people